The Men's Long Jump F12 had its Final held on September 13 at 9:05.

Medalists

Results

References
Final

Athletics at the 2008 Summer Paralympics